Blas Bernardo Irala Rojas (born 30 November 1983 in Piribebuy, Paraguay) is a Paraguayan footballer currently playing for Crucero del Norte of the Primera B Nacional in Argentina.

Teams
  Sport Colombia 2004
  12 de Octubre 2004
  Olimpia Asunción 2005–2007
  Silvio Pettirossi 2008
  Sol de América 2008
  2 de Mayo 2009
  Nacional Asunción 2010–2012
  Deportivo Capiatá 2013
  Crucero del Norte 2014–present

Titles
  Nacional 2011 (Torneo Apertura Paraguayan Primera División Championship)

References
 Profile at BDFA 
 

1983 births
Living people
Paraguayan footballers
Club Olimpia footballers
Club Nacional footballers
Sport Colombia footballers
Silvio Pettirossi footballers
Club Sol de América footballers
12 de Octubre Football Club players
Crucero del Norte footballers
Expatriate footballers in Argentina
Association footballers not categorized by position